Frederick Sullivan (1 February 1797 – 28 July 1873) was an English first-class cricketer who played for the Marylebone Cricket Club in the 1820s. He is recorded in one match in 1821, totalling 33 runs with a highest score of 20 and holding 2 catches.

References

Bibliography
 

English cricketers
English cricketers of 1787 to 1825
Marylebone Cricket Club cricketers
1797 births
1873 deaths